Dániel Rózsa (born 24 November 1984) is a Hungarian footballer who currently plays for Szombathelyi Haladás.

Honours  
Hungarian Second Division:  Winner: 2008

Club statistics

Updated to games played as of 19 May 2019.

References

External links
HLSZ

1984 births
Living people
Sportspeople from Szombathely
Hungarian footballers
Hungary international footballers
Szombathelyi Haladás footballers
Association football goalkeepers
Nemzeti Bajnokság I players